James Winfred Spruill (February 26, 1923 – January 8, 2006) was an American professional basketball and football player.

Early life
Spruill was born in Dublin, Texas, to Clint and Addie Spruill. He first played football at Dublin High School, where he earned four letters and All-District honours as a tailback.

College career
Spruill won a basketball scholarship to Rice University where he also played college football.

Professional career
Following his graduation, Spruill played professional football for the Baltimore Colts of the All-America Football Conference in the 1948 and 1949 seasons. He played in 26 total games, starting 15.

Spruill also played in the Basketball Association of America for the Indianapolis Jets in just one game during the 1948–49 BAA season. In that game he scored two points and recorded three personal fouls.  He was recommended to Jets coach Burl Friddle by Colts coach Cecil Isbell.

Coaching career
In 1951, Spruill became a high school football coach at Silsbee, Texas. He later coached at Durango High School in Durango, Colorado, Amphitheater High School in Tucson, Arizona, and Lompoc High School in Lompoc, California. He coached football at LHS from 1965 to 1974 before serving as athletic director until 1981.

Spruill died in 2006 at Boulder City, Nevada, at age 82.

BAA career statistics

Regular season

References

External links

 

1923 births
2006 deaths
American football tackles
American men's basketball players
Baltimore Colts (1947–1950) players
Basketball players from Texas
Guards (basketball)
High school football coaches in Arizona
High school football coaches in California
High school football coaches in Colorado
Indianapolis Jets players
People from Dublin, Texas
Players of American football from Texas
Rice Owls football players
Rice Owls men's basketball players
Sam Houston Bearkats football coaches
Undrafted National Basketball Association players